Church of the Assumption in Dzyatlava is a Catholic church in Belarus, built in 1624–1646 in Vilnian Baroque style. Nowadays the church is listed as a Belarusian Cultural Heritage object.

History 

The church was built in 1624–1646 by order of Lew Sapieha on a market square and replaced an older wooden church. It was destroyed by fire in 1743, all interiors and churchware were lost. In 1751  donated money for reconstruction. The architect A. Osikevich rebuilt the church in Vilnian Baroque style. Another fire damaged the roof in 1882. In 1900 the church's territory was fenced by a high stone wall with towers.

Gallery

References

Sources 

Churches in Belarus
Landmarks in Belarus